The Orpheum Theatre, formerly Player's Theatre, is a 299-seat off-Broadway theatre on Second Avenue near the corner of St. Marks Place in the East Village neighborhood of lower Manhattan, New York City.  It has been the home of the New York production of Stomp since it opened in 1994, with over 10,000 performances of the show having taken place there.

There may have been a concert garden on the site as early as the 1880s, but there was a theatre there by 1904. During the heyday of Yiddish theatre in the Yiddish Theater District in Manhattan, the venue was the Player's Theatre, and was part of the "Jewish Rialto" along Second Avenue. By the 1920s, the theatre was exhibiting films, but was converted back to dramatic use in 1958, with the first production, Little Mary Sunshine, opening in November 1959.

Significant productions include the revival and revamping of Cole Porter's musical Anything Goes in 1962, Your Own Thing in 1968, The Me Nobody Knows in 1970, The Cocktail Party in 1980, Key Exchange in 1981, Broken Toys! in 1981, Little Shop of Horrors in 1982, Sandra Bernhard's Without You I'm Nothing in 1988, The Lady in Question in 1989, Eric Bogosian's Sex, Drugs, Rock & Roll in 1990, John Leguizamo's Mambo Mouth in 1991, and David Mamet's Oleanna in 1992.

The theatre is owned by Liberty Theatres, a subsidiary of Reading International, who also own Minetta Lane Theatre.

See also
East Village, Manhattan
Yiddish theater

References

External links
 

Jews and Judaism in Manhattan
Theatres in Manhattan
Off-Broadway theaters
Yiddish theatre in the United States
East Village, Manhattan